Matija Smrekar (born 8 April 1989 in Zabok) is a Croatian footballer who plays as a forward for Zagorec Krapina.

He was the winner of the Croatian U-19 league in the 2007–08 season with the junior team of Varteks, where he was one of their best players throughout the season. His father Božidar Smrekar is a former football referee.

Career
Smrekar made his senior debut with the Varteks in 2006. In the 2007–08 season, on the 24th matchday of the Croatian First Football League (Prva HNL) against Hajduk Split (Varteks won 4–0), he scored two goals, had one assist and was named the man of match. On 3 May 2009, during the 2008–09 Prva Liga, he scored another goal for Varteks against Hajduk Split in Split (1–0) and was again named the man of the match.

Honours
Maribor
Slovenian PrvaLiga: 2012–13
Slovenian Football Cup: 2012–13

References

External links

1989 births
Living people
People from Zabok
Association football forwards
Croatian footballers
Croatia youth international footballers
Croatia under-21 international footballers
NK Varaždin players
CS Sedan Ardennes players
R. Charleroi S.C. players
NK Maribor players
NK Zavrč players
CS Pandurii Târgu Jiu players
Birkirkara F.C. players
NK Zagorec Krapina players
Croatian Football League players
Ligue 2 players
Challenger Pro League players
Slovenian PrvaLiga players
Liga I players
Maltese Premier League players
Second Football League (Croatia) players
Croatian expatriate footballers
Croatian expatriate sportspeople in France
Croatian expatriate sportspeople in Belgium
Croatian expatriate sportspeople in Slovenia
Croatian expatriate sportspeople in Romania
Croatian expatriate sportspeople in Malta
Expatriate footballers in France
Expatriate footballers in Belgium
Expatriate footballers in Slovenia
Expatriate footballers in Romania
Expatriate footballers in Malta